"Problem Child" is a song by American rock band the Beach Boys that was written and produced by Terry Melcher. It was released as a cassette single on July 23, 1990, in conjunction with the motion picture of the same name.

Music video
The music video depicts the band performing the song in a recording studio, complete with clips from the film shown on an overhead monitor in front of them. Two of the film's cast members appear in the video; Gilbert Gottfried as Mr. Peabody, who overlooks the session, and Michael Oliver as Junior, who sneaks into the studio to wreak havoc on the session.

Reception
The A.V. Club wrote: "By 1990, The Beach Boys were more brand than band, animated more by momentum and Mike Love's desire to keep some version of the group going than by any artistic ambition. You can find connections between 'Problem Child' and 'Wouldn't It Be Nice', but you might break something in the attempt."

Charts

See also
 Nyah nyah nyah nyah nyah nyah

References

1990 songs
1990 singles
The Beach Boys songs
Song recordings produced by Terry Melcher
Songs written by Terry Melcher
Songs written for films